Events from the year 1530 in art.

Events
 September 15 – Portrait of Saint Dominic in Soriano appears in the Dominican friary at Soriano Calabro, soon acquiring a reputation for having marvellous properties.

Works

 Paris Bordone – The Rest on the Flight into Egypt (approximate date)
 Bronzino – Portrait of Andrea Doria as Neptune (approximate date)
 Antonio da Correggio
 Assumption of the Virgin (fresco on dome of Parma Cathedral completed)
 Nativity (placed in church of St. Prosper of Reggio Emilia; now in Gemäldegalerie Alte Meister, Dresden)
 Lucas Cranach the Elder – The Judgement of Paris (approximate date)
 Il Garofalo – Madonna and Child and St Jerome
 Quentin Matsys – Ill-Matched Marriage (approximate completion date)
 Parmigianino – Portrait of a Man Reading a Book (approximate date; York Art Gallery, England)
 Titian – The Madonna of the Rabbit (approximate date)
 Portrait of Francis I of France (approximate date)

Births
 Giovanni Battista Armenini, Italian art historian and critic (died 1609)
 Nicolás Borrás, Spanish painter (died 1610)
 Barthel Bruyn the Younger, German portraitist, son of Barthel Bruyn the Elder (died 1607-1610)
 Francesco Camilliani, Italian sculptor of the Renaissance period (died 1586)
 Cesare da Bagno, Italian sculptor and medallist (died 1564)
 Giovanni Battista Fiammeri, Florentine Jesuit painter (died 1606)
 Lattanzio Gambara, Italian painter, active in Renaissance and Mannerist styles (died 1574)
 Aurelio Luini, Italian painter from Milan (died 1592)
 Simon Pereyns, Flemish painter who worked in Portugal, Spain, and Mexico (died 1600)
 Lorenzo Sabbatini, Italian painter of the Renaissance (died 1577)
 Adamo Scultori, Italian engraver (died 1585)
 Ercole Setti, Italian engraver (died 1618)
 Hendrick van den Broeck, Flemish painter active mainly in Rome (died 1597)
 Cesare Vecellio,  Italian engraver and painter (died 1601)
 Ottavio Semini, Italian painter born and trained in Genoa (died 1604)
 (born c.1530-1): Johan Gregor van der Schardt, Dutch-born sculptor (died c.1591)
 (born 1530–1535): Niccolò Circignani, Italian painter of the late-Renaissance or Mannerist period (died 1590)

Deaths
 February 24 – Properzia de' Rossi, Italian female Renaissance sculptor (born c. 1490)
 April 28 – Niklaus Manuel, Swiss dramaturg, painter, graphic artist and politician (born 1484)
 date unknown
Marco Basaiti, Venetian Greek painter and a rival of Giovanni Bellini (born 1470)
Quentin Matsys, Flemish painter (born 1466)
Bartolomeo Suardi, Italian painter and architect (born 1456)
Domenico Panetti, Italian painter of the Renaissance period, active mainly in Ferrara (born 1460)
Kanō Masanobu, chief painter of the Ashikaga shogunate, founder of the Kanō school of painting (born 1434)
Andrea Sabbatini, Italian painter of the Renaissance (born 1487)

 
Years of the 16th century in art